Operation Sassoon provides a basic generic framework for an emergency evacuation plan of any part of London, or Heathrow, in the case of a major terrorist attack in the British capital. It is part of an extensive anti-terror plan installed by the British Government in response to the rising threat of terrorist attacks in the United Kingdom. The plan, first drawn up in 2003, oversees the partial or complete evacuation of the inner parts of London after either a large-scale assault affecting a larger area of the city or an event having a lasting effect over a longer period of time, such as a biological, chemical or nuclear attack. Besides the actual evacuation process, Operation Sassoon covers the principles of large-scale evacuation, the installation of temporary shelters for evacuees in assigned areas outside the city, activation of the plan and the roles and responsibilities of agencies under the plan, as well as the deployment of police and military forces for maintaining civil order after a major attack has occurred.

History 
According to newspaper reports, the plans were drawn up upon the instructions of John Prescott MP, the Deputy Prime Minister, and senior officers at the Metropolitan Police. The draft plans were submitted to the London Resilience Forum, which at the time was chaired by Nick Raynsford MP with Ken Livingstone as his deputy.

A plan was developed by a multi agency team made up of local authority, transport and police representatives led by a senior MPS officer working closely with colleagues in the South East and East of England Regions. The first version of the framework document was published on 31 December 2003 and the current version was last revised in April 2005.

On 25 October 2004, Paul Goodman, Conservative MP for Wycombe, tabled a Parliamentary question in the House of Commons which was answered by Nick Raynsford MP, the then Minister of State for Local and Regional Government, on plans to use High Wycombe as a care shelter as part of Operation Sassoon. The answer given by the Minister is on record at Hansard.

Operation Sassoon has specific importance as the South East has the highest number of potential targets for disruptive action in England. These include:

 five major airports and the most congested airspace
 the largest number of nuclear establishments
 11 maritime ports, four container ports and the most congested sea-lanes
 around 700 miles of coastline
 the most complex motorway and railway networks
 a significant number of large-scale social and sporting events and locations

The surrounding regions of South Buckinghamshire, Hampshire and Oxfordshire would be involved in receiving evacuees.

The plan was replaced in 2009 by a less rigid set of arrangements to evacuate instead parts of London rather than the whole of London.  OP Sassoon has therefore been consigned to history.

What is known about Operation Sassoon 
 It lists Canary Wharf, Heathrow, Westminster, Whitehall and the City as possible targets.
 Public transport loading points (known as HUBS) have been pre-determined; people will be expected to walk to these locations, from where they will then be transported to unloading points (known as HEADS). Special road routes, known as High Capacity Emergency Access Routes (HCEARS) have been designated for people who self evacuate in their own private vehicles, and to allow for the expedient access of emergency services vehicles arriving from outside London. There is a specific traffic plan to deal with the use of the M25 and the radial feeding motorways. It will have a reliance on police resources as blocking vehicles.
 Railway stations have been identified within London, which are suitable for the embarkation of evacuees (Rail Hubs). Typically, these stations are the existing Central London termini, with suitable fall-backs also identified. In the event of a large-scale evacuation being invoked, the normal advertised timetable will be suspended and replaced by an evacuation service designed to provide a safe and simple means of transporting the maximum possible number of evacuees away from the affected area in the shortest possible time.
 An air exclusion zone will be introduced over the affected areas.
 Local Authorities and the voluntary sector will provide for evacuees. Initial reception will provide basic accommodation, drinking water and toilet facilities for up to 48 hours after the incident.

Controversies over Operation Sassoon 

On 21 September 2004, an internal Metropolitan Police inquiry was launched after detailed plans for the mass evacuation of London were found on the seat of a train in a Tesco carrier bag. The plans, discovered on one of four CD-ROMs which were in the carrier bag, were found by a warehouse worker from Essex who had been travelling on a commuter train between London and Gravesend, Kent. According to The Sun newspaper, the dossier was headed Operation Sassoon – Metropolitan Police Traffic Plan for the Mass Evacuation of London and dated 3 June 2004.

Operation Sassoon would see railway stations outside the capital receiving Londoners escaping a disaster. Local authorities in neighbouring counties were deeply concerned that the local infrastructure would not cope with the sheer volume of people fleeing the capital. They have stressed to the London Resilience Forum that evacuation should be used as a last resort and only in the most "catastrophic of circumstances".

The planning details for Operation Sassoon are being kept secret, hence no details being published by the Government or the media. As of August 2005, a Google search for the term brought up only 237 hits. Websites such as the Hampshire County Council website include some of the scarce traces of Operation Sassoon information on the internet.

There are plans to update the current Operation Sassoon have been subject to some disagreement between partners within London and the surrounding regions. It is unlikely that the new plan will be delivered for the August 2007 deadline.

Preparation for Operation Sassoon 
On 7 September 2003, the emergency services in London conducted a terrorism preparation exercise for the early stages of Operation Sassoon at Bank Underground station. Since 2003, there have been six large-scale live exercises and 32 "tabletop exercises" that test the effectiveness of strategic plans.

In July 2004, the London Resilience Forum announced in its second annual report its intention to develop detailed support plans for each agency involved in Operation Sassoon, including a communications strategy and "tabletop exercises" to test more detailed overall plans.

According to The Sun's newspaper article of 21 September 2004, road signs have been built by the Highways Agency ready for use in a major alert and road routes to be used in the event of such a disaster have been laid out.

Towns such as High Wycombe in Buckinghamshire are earmarked as temporary care shelters for evacuees.

External links 
Hampshire County Council's emergency website for Operation Sassoon
The London Resilience Forum's Strategic Emergency Plan (PDF file)
A Press Complaints Commission decision on a complaint made by John Prescott MP over articles published in the Sunday Express on Operation Sassoon in September 2004.
Is the South East prepared?
Connecting in a Crisis, an initiative by the BBC to inform the public during a civil emergency.

Safety